James Cameron Blyth (born 27 November 1890) was a Scottish footballer who played for Dumbarton.

References

1890 births
20th-century deaths
Year of death missing
Scottish footballers
Dumbarton F.C. players
Scottish Football League players
Association footballers not categorized by position
People from Govanhill and Crosshill